Nausheen Ali Sardar is an Indian television actress and model. She has appeared in many television shows and bollywood movies. She was born in Mumbai, India. Nausheen is still remember for her debut show Kkusum.

Sardar also appeared in television reality shows and music albums. She is one among Indian actress who featured in Pakistani movies.

Personal life
Nausheen's mother is Iranian and her father is Punjabi. Nausheen grew up in a Catholic society and studied at Mt. Carmel high school Chapel road Bandra west. and then went on to HR COMMERCE college. Nausheen is a commerce graduate.

Career
Nausheen made her Bollywood debut in 2009 with Three: Love, Lies, Betrayal.

Television

Web

Filmography

Music videos

Awards and recognition
2006 : Nausheen won the Sony Entertainment Awards for the Most Popular Actress on Television in the year 2006.

See also

List of Indian film actresses

References

External links

Indian television actresses
Living people
1968 births